Qiaojia County is a county in the northeast of Yunnan province, China, bordering Sichuan province to the north and west. The population was 625,000 in 2019, 33,200 of whom belonged to ethnic minorities. It is both the southernmost and westernmost county-level division of Zhaotong City and located entirely on the right bank of the Jinsha River. The river valleys of Qiaojia are some of the lowest points in Yunnan province, at around 900 meters. The name of the county literally means 'City of industrious artisans'.

The county is noted for being the site of the Baihetan Dam, located 40 km from the county seat. Construction of the dam required resettlement of 44,919 Qiaojia residents.

Qiaojia is located at the junction of several geological faults. It was hit by a magnitude 5.0 earthquake in 2020, and also affected by the 2014 Ludian earthquake.

Administrative divisions 
The county government is seated in Baihetan town. Qiaojia is subdivided into the town and township level divisions:

12 towns

4 townships

Climate

See also
Qiaojia Pine
Baihetan Dam

References

County-level divisions of Zhaotong